Neta Dobrin (born 27 October 1975) is a former Israeli politician who briefly served as a member of the Knesset for the Labor Party between February and April 2006.

Biography
Born in Safed, Dobrin gained a BA in education, sociology and anthropology at the University of Haifa, before studying for an MBA with the Israeli branch of the University of Derby. She also completed the first year of law studies at Sha'arei Mishpat College. Whilst at the University of Haifa, she was the representative for sociology students.

In 1998 she was elected onto Haifa city council, and chaired its committee for youth between 1998 and 2003, when she left the council. For the 2003 elections she was placed 32nd on the Labor Party's list, but missed out on a seat when the party won only 19 seats. However, she entered the Knesset on 15 February 2006 as a replacement for Orna Angel (who herself had only replaced Sofa Landver a week before). She lost her seat following the March 2006 elections.

References

External links
 

1975 births
Living people
20th-century Israeli women politicians
21st-century Israeli women politicians
Academic Center for Law and Science alumni
Alumni of the University of Derby
City councillors of Haifa
Israeli Jews
Israeli Labor Party politicians
Jewish Israeli politicians
Jewish women politicians
Members of the 16th Knesset (2003–2006)
People from Safed
University of Haifa alumni
Women members of the Knesset